Prunum is a genus of sea snails, marine gastropod mollusks in the subfamily Pruninae of the family Marginellidae, the margin snails.

The separation between the genera Prunum and Volvarina is not very precise.  They form together a monophyletic clade. The differences between these two genera are based on differences in the morphology of the shell, the radula, the radular cartilage, the mantle and the internal anatomy. A rather arbitrary criterion is currently used to distinguish between the two genera. The large species with a strong callus are placed in Prunum, the slender species with a thin callus in Volvarina, leaving in between many ambiguous species. To date (2010) there is no phylogenetic analysis behind the current generic placements

Species
Species within the genus Prunum include:

 Prunum abyssorum (Tomlin, 1916)
 Prunum adelantado Espinosa & Ortea, 2018
 Prunum aikeni T. Cossignani, 2018
 Prunum aitanae Espinosa & Ortea, 2019
 Prunum albertoangelai Cossignani, 2005
 Prunum albertoi Espinosa & Ortea, 1998
 Prunum albuminosa (Dall, 1919)
 Prunum aletes Roth, 1978
 Prunum amabile (Redfield, 1852)
 Prunum amphorale de Souza, 1992
 Prunum amygdalum (Kiener, 1841)
 Prunum annulatum (Reeve, 1865)
 Prunum antillanum (Sarasúa, 1992)
 Prunum apicinum (Menke, 1828)
 Prunum arangoi Espinosa & Ortea, 2015
 Prunum bahiense (Tomlin 1917)
 Prunum batabanoense Espinosa & Ortea, 2002
 Prunum bayonai Cossignani, 2009
 Prunum beali (McGinty, 1940)
 Prunum bellulum (Dall, 1890)
 Prunum boreale (A. E. Verrill, 1884)
 Prunum caledonicum Cossignani, 2001
 Prunum camachoi Espinosa & Ortea, 2003
 Prunum canasense Espinosa, Moro & Ortea, 2011
 Prunum caneli Espinosa, Ortea & Fernadez-Garcés, 2007
 Prunum canilla (Dall, 1927)
 Prunum capense (Krauss, 1848)
 Prunum carneum (Storer, 1837)
 Prunum cassis (Dall, 1889)
 Prunum catochense Cossignani, 2004
 Prunum chagosi Hayes & Boyer, 1997
 Prunum chumi Espinosa & Ortea, 2000
 Prunum cinctum (Kiener, 1834)
 Prunum cineraceum (Dall, 1889)
 Prunum circumvittatum (Weisbord, 1962)
 Prunum coltrorum Cossignani, 2005
 Prunum conchibellum Espinosa, Ortea & Moro, 2010
 Prunum cubanum Sarasúa & Espinosa, 1977
 Prunum curtum (G.B. Sowerby, 1832)
 Prunum damasoi Cossignani, 2006
 Prunum dawnbrinkae Massier, 1993
 Prunum egmontense Espinosa & Ortea, 2015
 Prunum dinisioi Cossignani, 2006
 Prunum enriquevidali Espinosa & Ortea, 1995
 Prunum estafaniae Pérez-Dionis, Ortea & Espinosa, 2009
 Prunum evelynae (Bayer, 1943)
 Prunum flori Espinosa, Ortea & Moro, 2010
 Prunum frumari Petuch & Sargent, 2012
 Prunum fulminatum (Kiener, 1841)
 Prunum gijon Espinosa & Ortea, 2006
 Prunum goliat Espinosa, Moro & Ortea, 2011
 Prunum gorgonense Roth, 1978
 Prunum gregorioi Espinosa & Ortea, 2018
 Prunum guttatum (Dillwyn, 1817)
 Prunum hartleyanum (Schwengel, 1941)
 Prunum holandae Espinosa & Ortea, 1999
 Prunum humboldti Espinosa, Ortea & Moro, 2009
 Prunum hunabi Espinosa & Ortea, 2015
 Prunum ianusi Espinosa & Ortea, 2015
 Prunum javii Espinosa, Ortea & Moro, 2013
 Prunum josealejandroi Espinosa, Moro & Ortea, 2011
 Prunum labiatum (Kiener, 1841)
 Prunum labrosum (Redfield, 1870)
 Prunum lalanai Espinosa & Ortea, 2013
 Prunum leonardhilli Petuch, 1990
 Prunum lipei (Clover, 1990)
 Prunum lizanoi Magana, Espinosa & Ortea, 2003
 Prunum lorenae Espinosa & Ortea, 2013
 Prunum macleani Roth, 1978
 Prunum magliaroi T. Cossignani & Lorenz, 2021
 Prunum magnificum (Sarasúa, 1989)
 Prunum marginatum (Born, 1778)
 Prunum mariateresae Cossignani, 2009
 Prunum martini (Petit, 1853)
 Prunum mingueloi Espinosa & Ortea, 2013
 Prunum montseae Espinosa, Ortea & Moro, 2014 
 Prunum nataliae Pérez-Dionis, Ortea & Espinosa, 2009
 Prunum negoi Cossignani, 2005
 Prunum niciezai Espinosa & Ortea, 1998
 Prunum nivosum (Hinds, 1844)
 Prunum nobilianum (Bayer, 1943)
 Prunum oblongum (Swainson, 1829) (nomen dubium)
 Prunum olivaeforme (Kiener, 1834)
 Prunum pacotalaverai Espinosa, Ortea & Moro, 2014 
 Prunum pellucidum (Pfeiffer, 1840)
 Prunum pinerum Sarasúa & Espinosa, 1977
 Prunum poeyi Espinosa & Ortea, 2015
 Prunum poulosi Lipe, 1996
 Prunum pruinosum (Hinds, 1844)
 Prunum prunum (Gmelin, 1791)
 Prunum pulchrum (Gray, 1839)
 Prunum pulidoi Espinosa & Ortea, 1999
 Prunum pyrumoides Lussi & Smith, 1999
 Prunum quelimanensis Bozzetti, 2001
 Prunum quini Ortea & Espinosa, 2018
 Prunum quinteroi Espinosa & Ortea, 1999
 Prunum redfieldii (Tryon, 1882)
 Prunum roosevelti (Bartsch & Rehder, 1939)
 Prunum rosasi Espinosa & Ortea, 2018
 Prunum roscidum (Redfield, 1860)
 Prunum rostratum (Redfield, 1870)
 Prunum rubens (Martens, 1881)
 Prunum sapotilla (Hinds, 1844)
 Prunum saulcyanum (Petit, 1851)
 † Prunum seriaense Harzhauser, Raven & Landau, 2018 
 Prunum similerato Ortega & Gofas, 2019
 Prunum smalli Espinosa & Ortea, 2002
 Prunum storeria (Couthouy, 1837)
  Prunum succineum (Conrad, 1846)
 Prunum sunderlandorum Petuch & Berschauer, 2020
 Prunum tacoense Espinosa & Ortea, 2014 
 Prunum tethys Lussi & Smith, 1999
 Prunum thalassicola Espinosa, Ortea & Fernadez-Garcés, 2007
 Prunum torticulum (Dall, 1881)
 Prunum triangulum Lussi & G. Smith, 2015
 Prunum virginianum (Conrad, 1868)
 Prunum walvisianum (Tomlin, 1920)
 Prunum woodbridgei (Hertlein & Strong, 1951)

Species brought into synonymy 

 Prunum abbreviatum (C.B. Adams, 1850) : synonym of Volvarina lactea (Kiener, 1841)
 Prunum adelum (Thiele, 1925) : synonym of Volvarina adela (Thiele, 1925)
 Prunum aguayoi Ortea & Espinosa, 1996 : synonym of Prunum lipei (Clover, 1990)
 Prunum agulhasensis Thiele, 1925 : synonym of Hydroginella agulhasensis (Thiele, 1925)
 Prunum alabaster Reeve, 1865 : synonym of Volvarina rubella navicella Reeve, 1865
 Prunum ameliensis (Tomlin 1917) : synonym of Volvarina ameliensis (Tomlin, 1917)
 Prunum attenuatum (Reeve, 1865) : synonym of  Volvarina attenuata (Reeve, 1865)
 Prunum augusta (Thiele, 1925): synonym of Dentimargo augusta (Thiele, 1925)
 Prunum avenacea (Deshayes, 1844): synonym of Prunum bellulum (Dall, 1890)
 Prunum avenella (Dall, 1881): synonym of Volvarina avenella (Dall, 1881)
 Prunum bahiensis [sic]: synonym of Prunum bahiense (Tomlin, 1917) (incorrect gender ending)
 Prunum avenellum (Dall, 1881): synonym of Volvarina avenella (Dall, 1881)
 Prunum batabanoensis Espinosa & Ortea, 2002: synonym of Prunum batabanoense Espinosa & Ortea, 2002
 Prunum bellum (Conrad, 1868): synonym of Prunum avenacea (Deshayes, 1844)
 Prunum caerulescens Lamarck, 1822 : synonym of Prunum prunum (Gmelin, 1791)
 Prunum cahuitaensis Magaña, Espinosa & Ortea, 2003: synonym of Prunum cahuitaense Magaña, Espinosa & Ortea, 2003 (incorrect gender ending)
 Prunum canasensis Espinosa, Moro & Ortea, 2011: synonym of Prunum canasense Espinosa, Moro & Ortea, 2011 (incorrect gender agreement of specific epithet)
 Prunum canellum (Jousseaume, 1875): synonym of Prunum rostratum (Redfield, 1870)
 Prunum cantharus Reeve, 1865 : synonym of Prunum capense (Krauss, 1848)
 Prunum capensis (Krauss, 1848) : synonym of Prunum capense (Krauss, 1848)
 Prunum carnum Storer, 1837  : synonym of Prunum carneum (Storer, 1837)
 Prunum charbarensis (Melvill, 1897)  : synonym of Volvarina charbarensis (Melvill, 1897)
 Prunum colomborum Bozzetti, 1995 : synonym of Marginella colomborum (Bozzetti, 1995)
 Prunum conchibellus Espinosa, Ortea & Moro, 2010  : synonym of Prunum conchibellum Espinosa, Ortea & Moro, 2010
 Prunum crassilabrum (G.B. Sowerby I, 1846)  : synonym of Prunum labrosum (Redfield, 1870)
 Prunum deliciosum (Bavay in Dautzenberg, 1912)  : synonym of Volvarina deliciosa (Bavay in Dautzenberg, 1913)
 Prunum dinisioi T. Cossignani, 2006: synonym of Volvarina dinisioi (T. Cossignani, 2006) (original combination)
 Prunum egmontensis [sic]: synonym of Prunum egmontense Espinosa & Ortea, 2015 (original spelling: incorrect gender agreement of specific epithet)
 Prunum evax Li, 1930  : synonym of Prunum sapotilla (Hinds, 1844)
 Prunum exile (Gmelin, 1791)  : synonym of Volvarina exilis (Gmelin, 1791)
 Prunum fortunatum (Clover & Macca, 1990): synonym of Volvarina fortunata Clover & Macca, 1990
 Prunum fraterculus E.A. Smith, 1915  : synonym of Prunum martini (Petit, 1853)
 Prunum fulgidum Lussi & G. Smith, 1999: synonym of Volvarina fulgida (Lussi & G. Smith, 1999) (original combination)
 Prunum hartleyanum (Schwengel, 1941): synonym of Prunum virginianum hartleyana (Schwengel, 1941)
 Prunum helena Thiele, 1925  : synonym of Hyalina helena (Thiele, 1925)
 Prunum hoffi Moolenbeek & Faber, 1991 : synonym of Canalispira hoffi (Moolenbeek & Faber, 1991)
 Prunum hondurasense (Reeve, 1865)  : synonym of Prunum pulchrum (Gray, 1839)
 Prunum hondurasensis (Reeve, 1865)  : synonym of Prunum pulchrum (Gray, 1839)
 Prunum insulanum (Gofas & Fernandes, 1988)  : synonym of Volvarina insulana Gofas & Fernandes, 1988
 Prunum joubini Bavay, 1913: synonym of Prunum bahiense (Tomlin, 1917)
 Prunum keenii Marrat, 1871: synonym of Hyalina keenii (Marrat, 1871)
 Prunum laetitium (Thiele, 1925): synonym of Volvarina laetitia (Thiele, 1925)
 Prunum longivaricosum Lamarck, 1822: synonym of Prunum guttatum (Dillwyn, 1817)
 Prunum mabellae (Melvill & Standen, 1901): synonym of Volvarina mabellae (Melvill & Standen, 1901)
 Prunum marianae Bozzetti, 1999: synonym of Prunum pyrumoides Lussi & G. Smith, 1999
 Prunum monile (Linnaeus, 1758): synonym of Volvarina monilis (Linnaeus, 1758)
 Prunum olivaeformis (Kiener, 1834): synonym of Prunum olivaeforme (Kiener, 1834)
 Prunum pergrande (Clover, 1974): synonym of Volvarina pergrandis Clover, 1974
 Prunum pergrandis [sic]: synonym of Prunum pergrande (Clover, 1974): synonym of Volvarina pergrandis Clover, 1974 (incorrect gender ending)
 Prunum riparia Gofas & Fernandes, 1992: synonym of Volvarina riparia Gofas & Fernandes, 1992
 Prunum roberti (Bavay, 1917): synonym of Volvarina roberti (Bavay, 1917)
 Prunum roosevelti Bartsch & Rehder, 1939  : synonym of Prunum amabile (Redfield, 1852)
 Prunum sauliae (G. B. Sowerby II, 1846): synonym of Volvarina sauliae (G. B. Sowerby II, 1846)
 Prunum serrei Bavay, 1913  : synonym of Volvarina serrei (Bavay, 1913)
 Prunum sowerbyanum Petit, 1851  : synonym of Prunum monile (Linnaeus, 1758)
 Prunum styrium Dall, 1889  : synonym of Volvarina styria (Dall, 1889)
 Prunum succinea (Conrad, 1846): synonym of Prunum succineum (Conrad, 1846)
 Prunum tacoensis Espinosa & Ortea, 2014: synonym of Prunum tacoense Espinosa & Ortea, 2014 
 Prunum terverianum (Petit de la Saussaye, 1851): synonym of Volvarina monilis (Linnaeus, 1758)
 Prunum watsoni (Dall, 1881): synonym of Eratoidea watsoni (Dall, 1881)
 Prunum yucatecana (Dall, 1881): synonym of Dentimargo yucatecanus (Dall, 1881): synonym of Dentimargo yucatecana (Dall, 1881)

References

 Cossignani T. (2006). Marginellidae & Cystiscidae of the World. L'Informatore Piceno. 408pp

External links

Marginellidae